Miles Parks McCollum (born August 23, 1997), known professionally as Lil Yachty, is an American rapper, singer, songwriter, and record producer. He first gained recognition on the internet in 2015 for his singles "One Night" and "Minnesota" (featuring Quavo, Skippa Da Flippa and Young Thug) from his debut EP Summer Songs. He released his debut mixtape Lil Boat in March 2016. In June 2016, Yachty announced that he had signed a joint venture record deal with Motown, Capitol Records, and Quality Control Music.

Yachty has released five studio albums, beginning with Teenage Emotions in 2017. His second and third studio albums, Lil Boat 2 and Nuthin' 2 Prove, were released in 2018, followed by Lil Boat 3, in 2020. Yachty's fifth studio album, entitled Let's Start Here, was released in 2023, and was inspired by psychedelic rock.  Four of his albums have charted within the top 20 of the Billboard 200, with Lil Boat 2 peaking at number 2. Yachty has also released several mixtapes and EPs throughout his career, with his most recent Michigan Boy Boat being released in 2021. Lil Yachty is also notable for his features on the 2016 multi-platinum songs "Broccoli" by DRAM and "ISpy" by Kyle, his eccentric hairstyle, and his optimistic image. Yachty was nominated for a Grammy Award for his work on "Broccoli".

Early life
Miles McCollum was born in Mableton, Georgia. He attended Alabama State University in fall 2015 but soon dropped out to pursue his musical career. He adopted the name "Yachty" and moved from his hometown of Atlanta to New York City to launch his career. In New York, he lived with a friend and networked with online street fashion personalities, while he built up his own Instagram following. He worked at McDonald's to supplement his income early in his career.

Career

2015–2017: "One Night", Lil Boat, and Teenage Emotions
Yachty first came to prominence in December 2015 when the SoundCloud version of his song "One Night" was used in a viral comedy video.

In February 2016, Yachty debuted as a model in Kanye West's Yeezy Season 3 fashion line at Madison Square Garden. Yachty's debut mixtape Lil Boat was released in March 2016.

In April 2016, Yachty collaborated with DRAM on the hit song "Broccoli", which peaked at number 5 on the Billboard Hot 100. He featured on Chance the Rapper's Coloring Book mixtape, released in May 2016. On June 10, 2016 he announced he had signed a joint venture record deal with Quality Control Music, Capitol Records, and Motown Records. Yachty released his second mixtape Summer Songs 2 in July 2016 with features from G Herbo,  Offset, and his former collective the "Sailing Team".

In June 2016, Lil Yachty appeared in XXL magazine as part of their 2016 Freshman Class. As part of this appearance, Yachty performed a 'freshman cypher' alongside Denzel Curry, Lil Uzi Vert, 21 Savage, and Kodak Black. As of March 2021, this cypher has received over 180 million YouTube views, by far the most for the XXL channel.

In December 2016, he was featured on the hip hop single "iSpy" by Kyle. He was featured in Tee Grizzley's single "From the D to the A", released in March 2017.

On May 26, 2017, Lil Yachty released his debut studio album, Teenage Emotions. It features guest appearances from Migos, Diplo, and YG, among others. Three promotional singles were released to coincide with the album. The first promotional single, "Harley", produced by K Swisha, was released on April 14, 2017. The second promotional single, "Bring It Back", produced by Free School, was released on May 4, 2017. The third promotional single, "X Men", produced by 30 Roc and Tillie and featuring a guest appearance from American rapper Evander Griiim, was released on May 18, 2017. He featured in a remix of "With My Team" by Creek Boyz, released December 15, 2017.

In 2017, Yachty appeared in several high-profile promotional campaigns. He starred alongside LeBron James in a Sprite commercial, where he is seen in an ice cave playing the piano. Lil Yachty was picked to be the face of the new Nautica and Urban Outfitters collection for the Spring 2017 season. Yachty also appeared in the "It Takes Two" video with Carly Rae Jepsen for Target.

2018–2022: Lil Boat 2, Nuthin' 2 Prove, and Lil Boat 3
In January 2018, it was reported that Lil Yachty and Takeoff were working on a collaborative project. This project has yet to be released as of 2022. Yachty's second studio album, Lil Boat 2, was released on March 9, 2018. Despite receiving mixed reviews from critics, Lil Boat 2 performed well commercially, debuting at number two on the US Billboard 200, with 64,000 album-equivalent units. The album featured 2 Chainz, Quavo, and Offset, Ugly God, among other guests. On October 19, 2018, Yachty released his third album, Nuthin' 2 Prove. The project received similarly mixed reception and debuted at No. 12 on the Billboard 200. Also in 2018, Yachty appeared on Social House's gold single "Magic in the Hamptons" and Bhad Bhabie's platinum single "Gucci Flip Flops", and worked with Donny Osmond to create a theme song for Chef Boyardee titled "Start the Par-dee". In December 2018, E-sports group FaZe Clan announced that Yachty had become their newest member. Yachty took on the name "FaZe Boat", in reference to his 'Lil Boat' nickname and mixtape.

After a relatively quiet 2019, Lil Yachty teamed up with fellow Atlanta artists Lil Keed, Lil Gotit, and veteran producer Zaytoven in February 2020 for a collaborative mixtape, A-Team. Yachty released the lead single for his next studio album, Lil Boat 3, on March 9, 2020. The song, titled "Oprah's Bank Account", features Drake and DaBaby. The release was accompanied by a 9-minute music video directed by Director X, in which Yachty dresses up as a parody of Oprah Winfrey. Lil Boat 3 was released on May 29, 2020 and debuted at number 14 on the US Billboard 200. A deluxe version of the album titled Lil Boat 3.5 was released on November 27. On October 19, 2020, Lil Yachty announced his intention to release a mixtape before the end of 2020. Michigan Boy Boat was released on April 23, 2021. The project draws heavily from the burgeoning Detroit rap scene, in contrast with Yachty's usual pop rap and Atlanta trap style.

Throughout 2020, Yachty was one of the many celebrities to gain a large following on social media app TikTok. Yachty performed the theme song for the 2020 revival of Saved by the Bell, which was a remixed version of the theme from the original television series. In early 2021, Yachty was reported to be producing and starring in a live-action movie based on the UNO card game, which is being developed by Mattel Films. Yachty is featured in the Pokémon 25th anniversary music album.

On October 11, 2022, Yachty released the non-album single "Poland", which had recently went viral online.

2023–present: Let's Start Here
In December 2022, Yachty's fifth studio album, then rumored to be called Sonic Ranch, was leaked online. The album was a departure from Yachty's signature trap sound, and was instead heavily influenced by psychedelic rock. On January 27, 2023, the album, entitled Let's Start Here, was released to critical acclaim.

Musical style 
Lil Yachty has called his style "bubblegum trap." His songs have sampled sounds from Mario Bros., Charlie Brown, the theme from Rugrats, the startup sound of a GameCube console, as well as J-pop singer Daoko. Other themes in his works include clouds, cotton candy, the Super Nintendo, and scenes from Pixar films. His friend TheGoodPerry is heavily involved in the production of his songs. Yachty's style has also been described as mumble rap.

Rolling Stone described his music as "catchy, intentionally dinky-sounding tunes packed with off-color boasts delivered in a proudly amateurish singsong." The Guardian called his music "fun, hook-first pop rap oblivious to songcraft and structure that doesn't take itself too seriously, with very little interest in legacy and even less in rap canon."

Personal life
In a 2016 interview for CNN, Yachty expressed support for Bernie Sanders in the 2016 presidential election, and praised Sanders for his work during the civil rights movement.

On October 20, 2021, Yachty announced the birth of his first child, a girl. The identity of the child's mother was not disclosed.

On December 20, 2018, Yachty signed with FaZe Clan. Yachty participated in competitive Fortnite tournaments.

2022 SafeMoon lawsuit

On February 18, 2022, in a class-action lawsuit filed against the cryptocurrency company SafeMoon that alleged the company is a pump and dump scheme, McCollum was named as a defendant along with professional boxer Jake Paul, musician Nick Carter, rapper Soulja Boy, and social media personality Ben Phillips for promoting the SafeMoon token on their social media accounts with misleading information. On the same day, the U.S. 11th Circuit Court of Appeals ruled in a lawsuit against Bitconnect that the Securities Act of 1933 extends to targeted solicitation using social media.

Filmography

Discography

 Teenage Emotions (2017)
 Lil Boat 2 (2018)
 Nuthin' 2 Prove (2018)
 Lil Boat 3 (2020)
 Let's Start Here (2023)

Awards and nominations

Billboard Music Awards

|-
| rowspan="3"| 2017
| rowspan="3"| "Broccoli" (with DRAM)
| Top Rap Collaboration
| 
|-
| Top Rap Song
| 
|-
| Top Streaming Song (Audio)
| 
|-

MTV Video Music Awards

|-
| rowspan="3"| 
| rowspan="2"| "Broccoli" (with DRAM)
| Best Hip Hop Video
| 
|-
| Best Collaboration
| 
|-
| "iSpy" (with Kyle)
| Best Visual Effects
| 
|-

Other awards

References

External links
 

1997 births
Living people
21st-century African-American male singers
African-American male models
African-American male rappers
African-American male singer-songwriters
Alabama State University alumni
American hip hop singers
Capitol Records artists
FaZe Clan
Male models from Georgia (U.S. state)
Mumble rappers
People from Mableton, Georgia
Pop rappers
Quality Control artists
Rappers from Atlanta
Record producers from Georgia (U.S. state)
Singer-songwriters from Georgia (U.S. state)
Southern hip hop musicians
Trap musicians
Twitch (service) streamers